The Union for French Democracy (UDF) was a centre to centre-right political party in France. It was founded in 1978 as an electoral alliance to support President Valéry Giscard d'Estaing in order to counterbalance the Gaullist preponderance over the political right in France. This name was chosen due to the title of Giscard d'Estaing's 1976 book, Démocratie française. The party brought together Christian democrats, liberal-radicals, and non-Gaullist conservatives, and described itself as centrist.

The founding parties of the UDF were Giscard's Republican Party (PR), the Centre of Social Democrats (CDS), the Radical Party (Rad.), the Social Democratic Party (PSD) and the Perspectives and Realities Clubs (CPR). The UDF was most frequently a junior partner in coalitions with the Gaullist Rally for the Republic (RPR) and its successor party, the Union for a Popular Movement (UMP). Prior to its dissolution, the UDF became a single entity, due to the defection of Republicans, Radicals and most Christian Democrats to the UMP and the merger of the other centrist components. The UDF effectively ceased to exist by the end of 2007, and its membership and assets were transferred to its successor party, the Democratic Movement (MoDem). The UDF's final leader was François Bayrou, who transferred his leadership to MoDem.

History

Foundation and early years
In 1974, Valéry Giscard d'Estaing was elected president of France. Two years later, his Gaullist prime minister, Jacques Chirac, resigned and created the Rally for the Republic (RPR) in order to restore the Gaullist domination over the republican institutions. Formally, this party stood in the right-wing parliamentary majority, but it criticised with virulence the policies of the executive duo composed of President Giscard d'Estaing and Prime Minister Raymond Barre.

During campaigning for the 1978 legislative election, in his Verdun-sur-le-Doubs speech, President Giscard d'Estaing noted that the political leanings of the French people were divided among four groups: the Communists (PCF), the Socialists (PS), the Neo-Gaullists (RPR) and his own followers. He therefore sought to formally organise a political grouping which would represent the position of his followers. Consequently, the UDF confederation was born.

Contrary to the Neo-Gaullists, the Giscardian UDF advocated less economic interventionism by the state, the decentralisation in aid of the local authorities, and a strong commitment towards the building of a federal Europe. According to the historian René Rémond, the UDF descended from the Orleanist tradition of the right, whereas the RPR was a reincarnation of the Bonapartist tradition, which promotes national independence by virtue of a strong state.

After the right (the RPR and UDF) won the 1978 legislative election and the subsequent focus of both groups towards the 1981 presidential campaign, the relations between the two parties of the parliamentary majority deteriorated. Indeed, RPR leader Jacques Chirac criticized the market-oriented and pro-European policy of the executive duo. During the 1979 European electoral campaign, Chirac published the Call of Cochin where the UDF was accused of being "the foreign party". As the UDF list, led by Simone Veil, obtained a very good result compared with RPR's score, the quarrels between the two parties and the rivalry between Giscard d'Estaing and Chirac contributed, in 1981, to the defeat of the incumbent UDF president who ran for a second term.

The Eighties
After the election of François Mitterrand as president, the two centre-right parliamentary parties reconciled. Gradually, the RPR abandoned Gaullist doctrine and joined the market-oriented and pro-European positions of the UDF. Although, they presented a common list at the 1984 European Parliament election, their leaders Chirac and Barre competed for the leadership of the French centre-right. Focused on winning the 1986 legislative election, Chirac, unlike Barre, accepted the principle of "cohabitation" with President Mitterrand. Furthermore, some UDF politicians (notably from the Republican Party) covertly supported Chirac. Consequently, he became Prime Minister, from 1986 to 1988, and the UDF played a supporting role in his cabinet and in the parliamentary majority.

Barre was a candidate in the 1988 presidential election, yet, despite his popularity, he was not supported by all UDF personalities. Giscard d'Estaing himself refused to choose clearly and publicly between his two former Prime Ministers. Eliminated in the first round, Barre called on his supporters to vote for Chirac in the second round, but despite this, Chirac was defeated by Mitterrand. After the re-election of Mitterrand, some UDF members participated as ministers in the left-wing cabinets of Prime Minister Michel Rocard. Others created a new parliamentary group, the Centrist Union, which occasionally voted with the Socialist Party or with the RPR.

For Giscard d'Estaing, Barre's failure to strengthen the UDF, allowed him retake the leadership of the UDF. However, his authority, and that of the other right-wing leaders (Chirac, Barre etc.) was contested by a new generation of politicians called the "renovation men", who accused the old guard leadership of bearing responsibility for the electoral defeats of the right.

The Nineties
In 1991, the dismissal of Rocard caused the departure of the centrist ministers from the government. All of the UDF and the RPR were allied in opposition to the Socialist power which was weakened by the economic crisis, scandals, and internal quarrels. The RPR/UDF coalition named "Union for France" comfortably won the 1993 legislative election and obtained a massive majority in the National Assembly. The new Neo-Gaullist Prime Minister Edouard Balladur nominated a large number of UDF members to his cabinet: François Léotard (PR) became minister of Defense, Gérard Longuet (PR) of Industry, Pierre Méhaignerie (CDS) of Justice, François Bayrou (CDS) of Education, Simone Veil (PR) of Health and Social Affairs, Alain Madelin (PR) of Commerce, Bernard Bosson (CDS) of Transport, Jean Puech (CDS) of Agriculture, André Rossinot (Rad) of Civil Service and Hervé de Charette (CPR) of Housing.

During the 1995 presidential campaign the different components of the UDF were unable to agree on a common candidacy and consequently they divided between the two RPR candidates. Most UDF members supported Edouard Balladur, whereas a minority endorsed Jacques Chirac, as Valéry Giscard d'Estaing had proposed. Supporters of Giscard formed the Popular Party for French Democracy (PPDF), that succeeded to the Perspectives and Realities Clubs, while the CDS merged with the PSD into Democratic Force (FD). In 1996 a former balladurien, François Léotard, was elected president of the UDF by defeating Alain Madelin.

After Chirac's election as president of France, some UDF ministers were dismissed as a result of their support for Balladur. Nevertheless, in Alain Juppé's cabinet, the UDF was given several ministries including Foreign Affairs with Hervé de Charette (PPDF), Defense with Charles Millon (PR), Economy and Finances with Alain Madelin (PR), Industry with Yves Galland (Rad), Education with François Bayrou (CDS/FD), Commerce with Jean-Pierre Raffarin (PR), Labour with Jacques Barrot (CDS/FD), Agriculture with Philippe Vasseur (CDS/FD), Culture with Philippe Douste-Blazy (CDS/FD), Economic Development with Jean Arthuis (PR) and Reform and Decentralization with Claude Goasguen (PR).

After the right-wing defeat in the 1997 legislative election, the UDF faced a major crisis. While the centrist components had merged into FD led by François Bayrou, the liberal-conservatives tried to overcome the chiraquiens/balladuriens fracture. The PR was joined by some politicians from the PPDF, such as Jean Pierre Raffarin (a former Republican) and was renamed Liberal Democracy (DL). DL soon began to reassert its autonomy within the alliance and finally broke ranks with the UDF in 1998. The event which triggered the split was the election of UDF politicians at the head of four regional councils, who won with support from the National Front. DL refused to condemn the arrangement, whilst the centrists did.

New UDF
This led to a re-organisation of UDF into the New UDF (Nouvelle UDF). The new alliance was launched as a single party with the merger of FD and the Republican Independent and Liberal Pole (PRIL, formed in 1998 by those DL members who refused to leave UDF). The Radicals and the PPDF remained as autonomous entities within the new party.

The former leader of Democratic Force, François Bayrou became the natural leader of the New UDF. He conceived of it as the embryo of a future centrist party which would include politicians from both the left and right. Bayrou ran for president in the 2002 presidential election, but some UDF leaders supported Chirac. Chirac won reelection comfortably, with Bayrou being eliminated after the first round, having gained only 6.8% of the vote. Bayrou subsequently refused Chirac's invitation to his group, to join the newly formed centre-right catch-all party, the Union for a Popular Movement (UMP) for the oncoming June 2002 parliamentary elections. Other UDF members, led by Philippe Douste-Blazy, Jacques Barrot and Pierre Méhaignerie, joined the UMP, leaving Bayrou somewhat isolated.

Post-election, the UDF joined the victorious centre-right grouping as a partner in the cabinet of prime minister Jean-Pierre Raffarin. Despite this, the UDF sometimes criticised the policies of the French government, although it did not wish to quit the majority coalition and enter the opposition, which was made up mostly of centre-left and left-wing parties. Subsequently, the UDF quit the cabinet (except for Gilles de Robien), after a cabinet reshuffle on 31 March 2004, but still decided to remain in the parliamentary majority coalition.

In 2004, the party, along with Italy's Democracy is Freedom – The Daisy, was one of the founding members of the European Democratic Party, intended to be home to all those Christian democrats and centrists who were disillusioned with the new course of the European People's Party, which had welcomed the Rally for the Republic and later the UMP. With the exit of the most conservative, Christian-democratic and conservative-liberal components of the UDF in 1998 and 2002, the UDF was now more of a centrist party with socially liberal tendencies.

There developed a split among UDF elected officials, between those such as Gilles de Robien and Pierre-Christophe Baguet, who favored closer ties with the UMP, and those such as François Bayrou who advocate independent centrist policies, while others such as Jean Dionis du Séjour tried steering for a middle course. The most likely reason for many of the UDF's elected officials favouring close ties with the UMP was that most of the UDF's elected positions are obtained through cooperative alliances with UMP. However, the party's base overwhelmingly favored independence. At the congress of Lyon, on 28–29 January 2006, 91% of the members voted to retain the independence of the UDF from the UMP and transform it into an independent centrist party. This outcome meant that the orientation of the evolving UDF would be that of a social-liberal party aiming for a balance between social-democratic and conservative policies.

Democratic Movement
On 16 May 2006, François Bayrou and his 10 other UDF deputies voted for the motion of censure brought by the Socialist deputies calling for the resignation of Prime Minister Dominique de Villepin's government, following the Clearstream affair. This motion had no chance of being passed, given that UMP had an absolute majority in the Assembly. Following this event, France's television authority then classified Bayrou and the other UDF deputies who had voted for the motion as being in the opposition for time allocation purposes; however, after Bayrou protested, he was classified as neither majority nor opposition.

On 25 April 2007, François Bayrou announced that he would be submitting a plan to a vote by UDF members to create a new Democratic Movement, which was finally launched on 10 May. However, most of the UDF's deputies protested and formed the New Centre (to support Nicolas Sarkozy). In the subsequent legislative elections held in June, the MoDem won only 3 seats (but 7.6% of the vote) whilst its New Centre rivals won 22 seats (but only 2.4%).

On 30 November 2007, the UDF effectively ceased to exist, and was fully integrated within the Democratic Movement, headed by François Bayrou.

Ideology and political position
UDF's most marked political trait was that it was in favor of European federalism, up to the point of turning the European Union into the United States of Europe. In that respect, UDF was the likely target of Chirac's Call of Cochin (1978), in which he denounced the pro-European policies of "the party of the foreigners".

Until 2002, the UDF spanned a somewhat wide ideological spectrum on the centre-right. A tongue-in-cheek characterisation of UDF's membership is that it was the union of everybody on the right that was neither far-right nor a Chirac supporter. However, the UDF suffered for its lack of cohesion, in contrast to the RPR. The economic policies proposed by UDF's leaders ranged from left-leaning, in favor of social justice, to strongly laissez-faire economics. Such divergences led the laissez-faire advocates of Liberal Democracy, such as Alain Madelin, to split out of UDF on 16 May 1998. This departure followed the elections of UDF politicians for the presidents of 4 regional councils with the votes of FN elects. Indeed, the Liberals refused to condemn these alliances.

Similarly, the social policies ranged from the conservatism of the likes of Christine Boutin, famously opposed to civil unions for homosexuals, to more socially progressive policies. Boutin was excluded from the UDF because of her strong social conservatism; in March 2001 she formed the Forum of Social Republicans, which is now affiliated with Reconquête.

During the 2007 presidential electoral campaign, François Bayrou presented himself as a centrist and a social-liberal, (he even opened the door to gay adoptions) proclaiming that if elected, he would "govern beyond the left-right divide". He won 18.6% of the vote, but this was not enough for him to reach the second round.

Factions
 Bayrouistes, those who wanted the UDF to be independent from UMP: Marielle de Sarnez, Jean-Louis Bourlanges, Thierry Cornillet, Gilles Artigues, Bernard Bosson, Anne-Marie Comparini, Charles de Courson, Jean-Christophe Lagarde, Jean Lassalle, Maurice Leroy, Hervé Morin, Rudy Salles, Gérard Vignoble, Nicolas Perruchot, Jean-Luc Préel, François Rochebloine, François Sauvadet
 Society in Movement, those who wanted close ties with UMP: Gilles de Robien, Olivier Jardé, Jean-Pierre Abelin, Pierre-Christophe Baguet, Jean Dionis du Séjour, Francis Hillmeyer, Michel Hunault, Stéphane Demilly, Yvan Lachaud, André Santini, Francis Vercamer, Claude Leteurtre, Rodolphe Thomas

On 10 May 2007, when Bayrou launched his new Democratic Movement, only 6 deputies out of 29 (Pierre-Cristophe Baguet is not counted as he was expelled from the party on 10 October 2006) followed him (Gilles Artigues, Anne-Marie Comparini, Jean-Christophe Lagarde, Jean Lassalle, Gérard Vignoble and he himself). The others, comprising the members of Society in Movement and also Hervé Morin, Jean-Louis Bourlanges and other Bayrou's supporters until then, joined the presidential majority coalition in support of the new President Nicolas Sarkozy and formed a new "centrist pole" within it, the New Centre led by Hervé Morin.

Composition

Presidents
 Jean Lecanuet (1978–1988)
 Valéry Giscard d'Estaing (1988–1996)
 François Léotard (1996–1998)
 François Bayrou (1998–2007)

Election results

Presidential elections

Legislative elections

European elections

Literature

External links
 Official web site (Redirects to Democratic Movement's official website)

Notelist

References

 
1978 establishments in France
2007 disestablishments in France
Centrist parties in France
Christian democratic parties in Europe
Defunct political parties in France
European Democratic Party
Liberal parties in France
Member parties of the European People's Party
Political parties disestablished in 2007
Political parties established in 1978
Political parties of the French Fifth Republic
Valéry Giscard d'Estaing
Pro-European political parties in France